Paraqti (Quechua paray to rain, -pti, qti a suffix, "if it rains", Hispanicized spelling Paracte) is a mountain in the Cordillera Central in the Andes of Peru, about  high. It lies in the Junín Region, Yauli Province, Yauli District, and in the Lima Region, Huarochiri Province, Chicla District. Paraqti is situated near the Antikuna mountain pass, southwest of Tuku Mach'ay and Chinchirusa, and east of Chuqi Chukchu.

References

Mountains of Peru
Mountains of Junín Region
Mountains of Lima Region